Harry Cameron (2 August 1947 – 20 June 2021) was an Australian professional rugby league footballer who played for Eastern Suburbs in the New South Wales Rugby League (NSWRL) competition and Wests Brisbane in the Brisbane Rugby League.

Playing career
Initially approached by Cronulla-Sutherland when he was playing for Narrabri, Cameron was eventually signed by Eastern Suburbs in 1971.

Cameron was selected to represent Queensland in five games against New South Wales in 1975 and 1976.

Cameron played in four grand finals, two with Eastern Suburbs (a loss to Manly in 1972 and a win over Canterbury in 1974) and two back-to-back wins with Wests Brisbane in 1975 and 1976.

Footnotes

External links
Profile at Yesterday's Hero

1947 births
2021 deaths
Australian rugby league players
Sydney Roosters players
Wests Panthers players
Queensland rugby league team players
Rugby league centres
People from New England (New South Wales)
Rugby league players from New South Wales
Sportsmen from New South Wales